Eigg is a Scottish Island.

Eigg may also refer to:
 Eigg Mountain: a highland region in Antigonish County, Nova Scotia, Canada
 MV Eigg, a 1974 car ferry built for Caledonian MacBrayne

See also 
 Egg (disambiguation)